The Norwegian International Film Festival is a film festival held annually in Haugesund, Norway. The festival goes back to 1973.

In 1985, the Amanda award was instituted. The Amanda is awarded every year at the festival in different movie categories. The award is a sculpture by the Norwegian sculptor Kristian Kvakland, measuring 30 cm (12") and weighing 2.5 kg (5.5 lb).

See also
 List of Amanda Award winners
 Morten Qvale, Norwegian fashion photographer

External links
 Official website

 
Film festivals in Norway
Film festivals established in 1973